Oligosoma kahurangi is a species of skink found in New Zealand.

References

Oligosoma
Reptiles described in 2021
Reptiles of New Zealand
Endemic fauna of New Zealand
Taxa named by Geoff B. Patterson
Taxa named by Rod A. Hitchmough
Endemic reptiles of New Zealand